In the Czech Republic, a statutory city is a municipal corporation that has been granted city status by Act of Parliament. It is more prestigious than the simple title  ("town"), which can be awarded by the cabinet and chair of the Chamber of Deputies to a municipality which applies for it.

Differences of statutory city
Statutory cities are allowed to subdivide into self-governing city boroughs (sg.  or city parts ) with their own elected councils; such a statutory city has to issue a statute that delimits power to boroughs. As of 2022 only seven statutory cities have done so. Cities Brno, Plzeň, Ústí nad Labem and Pardubice are divided into city boroughs, and Liberec has only one city borough with rest of the city being administered directly. Brno is divided into city parts, and Opava has eight city parts with rest of the city being administered directly. Also the capital of Prague, while not being de iure statutory city, is subdivided into similar self-governing boroughs.

History
The model is derived from its common origin in Austria-Hungary. Until 1928, 11 cities in the Czech lands received the statutory city title: Prague, Liberec, Brno, Jihlava, Kroměříž, Olomouc, Uherské Hradiště, Znojmo, Opava, Frýdek, and Bielsko (which became a part of Poland in 1920). On 1 December 1928 their count was reduced to five (Prague, Liberec, Brno, Olomouc and Opava). In 1942 Plzeň became a statutory city.

Between 1949 and 1967, the institute of statutory cities was canceled by reform in self-government and the establishment of regions. Only Prague remained a de facto statutory city. After 1967, several cities received similar position as Prague (Brno, Plzeň, Ostrava and Ústí nad Labem), but the statutory city title wasn't used.

The concept was renewed after the fall of communism by the Act on Municipalities in 1990, which established 13 statutory cities in addition to Prague, the capital city which is still a de facto statutory city.

Unlike Austria, before districts of the Czech Republic were abolished only the three largest cities (Brno, Ostrava and Plzeň) constituted a district on their own; the others were a part (though always a capital, except Havířov) of a district with smaller municipalities. As the prestige associated with statutory city status grew, 12 additional statutory cities were created by the Act on Municipalities in 2000 and its four later amendments.

There are only two statutory cities, Havířov and Třinec, that are not seats of their eponymous districts.

List
Since August 2018, there are 26 statutory cities (plus Prague), comprising all the Czech cities over 40 thousand inhabitants (and Třinec):

References

.S
Cities
Czech Republic, Statutory city
Populated places in the Czech Republic
Subdivisions of the Czech Republic